Karameh (Arabic: كرامة, 'dignity') may refer to:

Karameh or Al-Karameh, a town in central Jordan
Battle of Karameh, 1968
Karameh Border Crossing, between Jordan and Iraq
Karameh, East Azerbaijan, Iran
Kharameh County or Karameh County, Fars Province, Iran
Kharameh, a city

See also
Karamah (disambiguation), literary Arabic pronunciation
Karam (disambiguation)
Karama (disambiguation)
Karamat (disambiguation)
Karami also the francicized Karamé, alternative spellings of Karameh 
Karam (disambiguation)